Adkinson is a surname. Notable people with the surname include:

 Joseph B. Adkinson (1892–1965), American Medal of Honor recipient
 Mary Osburn Adkinson (1843–1918), American social reformer

References 

English-language surnames